Will Brown (born December 31, 1991) is an American sports shooter. He competed in the men's 10 metre air pistol event at the 2016 Summer Olympics.

References

External links
 

1991 births
Living people
American male sport shooters
Olympic shooters of the United States
Shooters at the 2016 Summer Olympics
Place of birth missing (living people)